Centrism is a political outlook or position involving acceptance or support of a balance of social equality and a degree of social hierarchy while opposing political changes that would result in a significant shift of society strongly to the left or the right.

Both centre-left and centre-right politics involve a general association with centrism that is combined with leaning somewhat to their respective sides of the left–right political spectrum. Various political ideologies, such as Christian democracy, Pancasila, and certain forms of liberalism like social liberalism, can be classified as centrist, as can the Third Way, a modern political movement that attempts to reconcile right-wing and left-wing politics by advocating for a synthesis of centre-right economic platforms with centre-left social policies.

Usage by political parties by country

Australia 
There have been centrists on both sides of politics who serve alongside the various factions within the Liberal and Labor parties. Centrism is represented by the moderates in the Liberal Party and Labor Right in the Labor Party.

The Australian Democrats are the most prominent centrist party in Australian history. The party had representation in the senate from 1977 to 2007, frequently holding the balance of power. Formed by Don Chipp on a promise to "Keep the Bastards Honest", it was known to have represented the "middle ground". The party regained registration in 2019.

In addition, many smaller groups have formed in response to the bipartisan system that uphold centrist ideals. South Australian Senator Nick Xenophon launched his centrist political party called the Nick Xenophon Team (NXT) in 2014, renamed Centre Alliance in 2018.

Belgium 
The traditional centrist party of Flanders was the People's Union which embraced social liberalism and aimed to represent Dutch-speaking Belgians who felt culturally suppressed by Francophones. The New Flemish Alliance is the largest and, since 2009, the only extant successor of that party. It is, however, primarily composed of the right wing of the former People's Union and has adopted a more liberal-conservative ideology in recent years.

Among French-speaking Belgians, the Humanist Democratic Centre is a centre party as it is considerably less conservative than its Flemish counterpart, Christian Democratic and Flemish.

Other parties in the centre of the political spectrum are the liberal Reformist Movement and the French-speaking minority party DéFI.

Brazil 
There are several centrist parties in Brazil, such as the Brazilian Democratic Movement (MDB), a catch-all party, one of the largest political parties in Brazil.

The Brazilian Social Democracy Party (PSDB) is another example of a centrist party in Brazilian politics.

Other centrist parties include the Social Democratic Party (Brazil, 2011) (PSD), Green Party (Brazil) (PV), Citizenship (Brazil) (CID) and Republican Party of the Social Order (PROS)

Due the high number of center parties on Brazil, They exert a major position on local politics, and due that, parties that are not part of major parties of Right-Wing or Left-Wing are pejoratively called Centrão (The Big Center).

Canada 

Throughout modern history, Canadian governments at the federal level have governed from a moderate, centrist political position, practising "brokerage politics". Both the Liberal Party of Canada and the Conservative Party of Canada (or its predecessors) rely on attracting support from a broad spectrum of voters. The historically predominant Liberals position themselves at the centre of the Canadian political scale, being more moderate and centrist than the centre-right Conservative. In the late 1970s, Prime Minister Pierre Elliott Trudeau claimed that his Liberal Party of Canada adhered to the "radical center". Far-left and far-right politics have never been a prominent force in Canadian society.

Croatia 
Croatian People's Party – Liberal Democrats and People's Party – Reformists may be considered centrist parties. The agrarian Croatian Peasant Party became moderate and centrist during its last years, having been centre-right in the past.

Czech Republic 
The Czech Republic has many prominent centrist parties, including the syncretic populist movement ANO 2011, the civil libertarian Czech Pirate Party, the long-standing Christian and Democratic Union – Czechoslovak People's Party and the localist party Mayors and Independents.

Estonia

France 
France has a tradition of parties that call themselves "", though the actual parties vary over time: when a new political issue emerges and a new political party breaks into the mainstream, the old centre-left party may be de facto pushed rightwards, but unable to consider itself a party of the right, it will embrace being the new centre: this process occurred with the Orléanism, Moderate Républicanism, Radical Republicanism and Radical-Socialism.

The most notable centrist party is Renaissance (LREM), founded by Emmanuel Macron, elected President of France in May 2017. Macron prefers not to use the term "centrist" to describe himself, though his policies tend to be centrist. Another party is the Democratic Movement of François Bayrou, founded in 2007, which was the successor of the Christian democratic Union for French Democracy.

Germany 

 is used for the political centre and centrism. Historically, the German party with the most purely centrist nature among German parties to have had current or historical parliamentary representations was most likely the social-liberal German Democratic Party of the Weimar Republic (1918–1933).

During the Weimar Republic (and again after the Nazi period), there existed a Zentrum, a party of German Catholics founded in 1870. It was called Centre Party not for being a proper centrist party but because it united left-wing and right-wing Catholics, because it was the first German party to be a Volkspartei (catch-all party) and because his elected representatives sat between the liberals (the left of the time) and the conservatives (the right of the time). However, it was distinctly right-wing conservative in that it was not neutral on religious issues (such as secular education), being markedly against more liberal and modernist positions.

The main successor of Zentrum after the return of democracy to West Germany in 1945, the Christian Democratic Union, has, throughout its history, alternated between describing itself as right-wing or centrist and sitting on the right-wing (with the Free Democratic Party in its social liberal moments sitting at its left, in the centre and themselves sitting at the centre, with the FDP in its classical liberal moments sitting at its right, in the right-wing). The representatives of the Social Democratic Party of Germany, although they have referred to themselves as "the new middle" many times since the 1990s (under the influence of the Third way of the time), however, they feel less at ease in describing their party as centrist due to their history and socialist identity.

Alliance 90/The Greens was founded in 1993 as a merger of the East German Alliance 90 (a group of centrist and transversalist civil rights activists) and the (West) German Greens. The latter was a coalition of various unorthodox-left politicians and more liberal "realists". This Bundestag party also hesitates in using the term centre, although it distances itself from the left, which identifies it for the moment as a transversalist party. The transversalist moderation of the party and its position in the Bundestag between the Social Democrats and the Christian Democrats also points somewhat to The Greens being a more or less centrist party.

In the state parliaments of specific German states, other specifically regional parties could be identified as centrist. The South Schleswig Voter Federation of the Danish and Frisian minorities in the state of Schleswig-Holstein currently has a centrist political position, although, in the past, the party usually leaned to the left. In the German presidential elections of 2009, 2010 and 2012, it supported the candidates of the Social Democrats and the Greens. In Bavaria, the Free Voters party at the state parliament may also be seen as a centrist party.

Greece 
In modern Greek politics, the roots of centrism can be traced to centrist politician and founder of the Agricultural and Labour Party, Alexandros Papanastasiou. In 1961, Georgios Papandreou created, along with other political leaders, the coalition party of the Centre Union. Five parties were merged: Liberal Party, Progressive Agricultural Democratic Union, National Progressive Center Union, and Popular Social Party into one, with strong centrist agenda, opposed equally to the right-wing party of the National Radical Union and the left-wing party of the United Democratic Left. The Centre Union Party was the last Venizelist party to hold power in Greece. The party nominally continued to exist until 1977 (after the Junta, known as the Center Union – New Forces), when its successor Union of the Democratic Centre (EDIK) party was created.

Union of Centrists was created by Vassilis Leventis in 1992 under the title "Union of Centrists and Ecologists", though the name was changed shortly after. The Union of Centrists claims to be the ideological continuation of the old party Center Union. The party strives to become "the political continuance of the centrist expression in Greece". Leventis aimed to become part of the Venizelist legacy of some great politicians of the past, such as Eleftherios Venizelos and George Papandreou Sr. However, the party's total influence had been marginal until 2015, with 1.8% of the total votes (in the January 2015 Greek legislative election) being its highest achievement before finally making its way to the Greek Parliament in September 2015 with 3.4% of the total votes and nine members elected.

India 

Indian National Congress,Aam Aadmi Party and Nationalist Congress Party are the centrist national parties.

Two state parties, Bharat Rashtra Samithi, and Telugu Desam Party
 are also described as centrist along with Actor turned politician Kamal Haasan's party named Makkal Needhi Maiam, meaning People's Centre for Justice.

Indonesia 

Golkar, a major political party in Indonesia, has established and also gained a reputation as a centrist party, when it comes to addressing the challenges of the country's diversity. Pancasila and the unity of Indonesia has been always being reference fundamental norm in resolving various problems.

Quoting from the statement of Airlangga Hartarto (General Chair of the Golkar Party 2017–present), "Living no one behind for the sake of the people, without distinguishing who they are, and where they are. Golkar is an inclusive political party that works to ensure an equal distribution of welfare for all people".

Ireland 
In the Republic of Ireland, both main political parties (Fianna Fáil and Fine Gael) claim the political centre ground but lean to the centre-right. The two parties have broadly similar policies, with their primary division being in Irish Civil War politics. Fine Gael is aligned with Christian democratic parties in Europe via its membership in the European People's Party.

Israel 
In Israel, centrism is represented by the Yesh Atid Party led by Yair Lapid, the former Prime Minister of Israel. The party was founded in 2013 and has remained a major player on the political scene. It served in government between 2013 and 2015, with Lapid serving as Israel's Finance Minister and a member of the Security Cabinet. In 2020, after a year of political turmoil in Israel, Yair Lapid became the Leader of the Opposition to the fifth government of Benjamin Netanyahu, and in 2021 he was sworn in as Minister of Foreign Affairs in the government of Naftali Bennett. After that, he became the prime minister of Israel in June 2022.

Yair Lapid published a long political essay entitled Only the center can hold: Democracy and the battle of ideas in which he laid out his vision of political centrism in Israel.

Japan 
After World War II, the right-wing Liberal Democratic Party (LDP) became the ruling force in Japan from 1955 and was opposed to the left-wing Japan Socialist Party (JSP). This is called the 1955 System. However, since the 1960s, centrist parties have emerged, old Komeito, the Democratic Socialist Party, and the Socialist Democratic Federation. In 1992, reformers left the right-wing LDP and founded the centre to centre-right liberal Japan New Party, but it was disbanded after two years.

The New Frontier Party (NFP) was founded by politicians with various ideologies, including Buddhist democrats, social democrats, liberals, and conservatives. The NFP was a political coalition to oppose the LDP, and is therefore generally regarded as a centrist party, although it had no coherent ideology.

Founded in 1998 by moderates of the conservative LDP and the socialist JSP, the Democratic Party of Japan (DPJ) advocated liberalism and "Democratic Centrism" as its main ideology. The Democratic Party for the People (DPP), which continues the current DPJ trend, is advocating "reformist centrism". The Constitutional Democratic Party of Japan (CDP) is more progressive in inheriting DPJ liberalism, but at the same time advocates for traditional Japanese virtues.

Netherlands 
In the Netherlands, four moderate centrist to centre-right parties have sent members into the Third Rutte cabinet since 2017. From them, the Christian Democratic Appeal (CDA) and the People's Party for Freedom and Democracy (VVD) tend to be centre-right, whilst the social liberal Democrats 66 (D66) are more centrist. The Protestant Christian Union is a small Christian Democratic party with transversalist positions less typical in European centrist parties. While it is left-leaning on immigration, welfare and the environment, it is more conservative on social issues, such as drugs and euthanasia. They have participated in several coalitions due to their moderate centrist politics.

Another centrist party is the populist Pensioners' interests party 50PLUS which combines social democratic, social liberal and social conservative positions.

Livable Netherlands was originally a centrist political movement of local grass-root parties with an anti-establishment touch similar to early D66. However, the party entered in 2002 national parliament with a right-wing populist programme based on security and immigration as the major issues.

In the 1980s and 1990s, two self-described "centre" parties, the Centre Party and the Centre Democrats, were represented in the Dutch parliament at some point. However, these parties were considered far right (in the case of the Centre Democrats) or even extreme right (in the case of the Centre Party) in their opinion about foreign immigration. Both parties denied being racist or extremist. The party slogan of the Center Party was "", and in some respect could be seen as a centrist (or more correctly, Third Position) party since it borrowed ideas from the political (far) right (a tough stand on immigration combined with typical racial prejudice) and the political left (mixed economy, green politics). However, both parties did not have a coherent ideology; they were one-issue parties focused on what they perceived as mass immigration from non-European countries.

New Zealand 
Centrism in New Zealand has only been mainstream since New Zealand First was founded in 1993. The party platforms itself on a broad centrist position mainly on economic issues, populism and while being generally conservative on social issues, favoring binding referenda instead of MPs making major social decisions. New Zealand First could be described as Syncretic politically, or adopting key elements from the traditional left-right political spectrum. The party has twice found itself the kingmakers under the mixed-member proportional representation electoral system (MMP), meaning that they choose who will form the next government. This has happened in 1996 and in 2017.

Small centrist parties such as The Opportunities Party (TOP) have been formed in the past, but they have not gained major support and have never passed the 5% threshold to enter parliament. The role of centrism in New Zealand has been mainly to work with parties to form coalition governments and to provide alternatives to governments, and their ability to do so is mainly due to the MMP electoral system which provides more ground for minor parties in Parliament. In the 2020 New Zealand general election where Jacinda Ardern and the New Zealand Labour Party achieved a majority in the New Zealand House of Representatives, New Zealand First was not re-elected to Parliament due to the party's inability to reach the 5% threshold to enter parliament. As a result, the current 53rd New Zealand Parliament has no political parties defined as "centrist".

Nordic countries 

In most of the Nordic countries, there are Nordic agrarian parties. In addition to the centrist position on the socio-economic left-right scale, these share a clear, separate ideology.

This position is centred on decentralisation, a commitment to small business and environmental protection. Centrists have aligned themselves with the Liberal International and European Liberal Democrat and Reform Party. Historically, these parties were farmers' parties committed to maintaining rural life. In the 1960s, these parties broadened their scope to include non-farmer-related issues and renamed themselves the Centre Party in Sweden, Venstre in Denmark, Centre Party in Finland, Centre Party in Norway and Progressive Party in Iceland.

Neither the Centre Democrats (a now-defunct centrist political party) nor the Liberal Alliance (a political party founded as a centrist social liberal party, but that now is a classical liberal party), both of Denmark, are rooted in centrist agrarianism.

Pakistan 
Pakistan Tehreek-e-Insaf (PTI), founded by Imran Khan, claims to be a centrist political party. Following the general election of 2013, PTI emerged as the second-largest political party in Pakistan by number of votes. In July 2018, it won the general elections of Pakistan and chairman Imran Khan became Prime Minister.

Palestine 
The Third Way is a small centrist Palestinian political party active in Palestinian politics. Founded on 16 December 2005, the party is led by Salam Fayyad and Hanan Ashrawi.

In the January 2006 PLC elections, it received 2.4% of the popular vote and won two of the Council's 132 seats. The party presents itself as an alternative to the two-party system of Hamas and Fatah.

Poland 

Civic Platform (PO), ruling from 2007 to 2015, began in 2001 as a liberal conservative party but later, under the leadership of Donald Tusk, became typically centrist to attract left-leaning liberal voters. Depending on the context, it is described as either Christian democratic (it is a member of the European People's Party), conservative, liberal, or social. Its pragmatism, technocracy and lack of ideology have nevertheless been criticized. Under Grzegorz Schetyna, it announced that it shifted to the right. Under its current leader Borys Budka, as a part of the Civic Coalition, it turned to progressivism again, as seen by policies proposed by their candidate, Rafał Trzaskowski, in the 2020 presidential election. Other political groups, such as Polish People's Party (PSL), may be described as centrist too. In contrast, the national-moral right-wing Law and Justice is socially conservative while usually at the same time being economically left-wing and favourable to protectionist policies). The most recent political party in the Polish parliament, Poland 2050, led by Szymon Hołownia, has been described as ideologically centrist with strong pragmatic influences.

Spain 
The only national party that defends itself as a centrist party is Citizens, whose platform is increasingly perceived as right-wing by Spanish citizens, as the Centro de Investigaciones Sociológicas surveys show. In April 2018, Ciudadanos obtained a 6.77 when ranging political parties from 1 to 10, where one was farthest left and ten its equivalent on the right. It first entered the Cortes Generales in 2015.

In Catalonia, where the party was born, many people even consider it an extreme right-wing party, considering its fierce "opposition to nationalism". Not even the media agree on its place, and several newspapers from different ideologies manifest that Citizens is either left or right, depending on their political line. Regardless of subjective opinions, the truth is that Ciudadanos has always tried to reach agreements with Union, Progress and Democracy (UPyD), which Spanish voters most traditionally consider to be the closest to the centre according to several opinion polls. This popular perception was pointed out by UPyD, which positions itself simultaneously on the political centre and cross-sectionalism, thus embracing ideas across the political spectrum.

UPyD has lost many of its voters to Ciudadanos, the latter counting with ten representatives in the Spanish Congress in the last election. Electors also consider as centrists the Convergence and Union coalition from Catalonia and the Basque Nationalist Party from the Spanish Basque Country, although these two usually consider themselves as right-centrist parties.

Switzerland 
In Switzerland, the political centre is traditionally occupied by the so-called "bourgeois" parties: FDP.The Liberals (centre-right), the Christian Democratic People's Party (centre to centre-right) and the much smaller Evangelical People's Party (centre to centre-left).

Recently, some new parties were founded that claimed to be part of the political centre: the Conservative Democratic Party (centre to centre-right), a split from the right-wing populist Swiss People's Party and a self-styled centre party and the Green Liberal Party (centre), a split from the leftist Green Party.

The Social Democratic Party is considered to be more to the left than to the centre.

In Switzerland, the centrist parties tend to cooperate closely in Canton parliaments and municipal councils.

United Kingdom 
In 1981, Roy Jenkins, David Owen, Shirley Williams and Bill Rodgers, known collectively as the "Gang of Four", launched the Social Democratic Party, outlining their policies in what became known as the Limehouse Declaration. The "Gang of Four" were centrists who defected from the Labour Party because of what they perceived to be the influence of Militant and the "hard left" within it. The SDP merged with the Liberal Party in 1988 to create the centrist Liberal Democrats.

In the mid to late 1990s, Labour, under the leadership of Tony Blair, began to move towards a centrist Third Way policy platform, adopting the campaign name New Labour. The New Labour era ended when Blair's successor Gordon Brown lost the 2010 United Kingdom general election to the Conservatives. Brown's successor as leader, Ed Miliband, moved the party to the left of New Labour. The Blue Labour movement, launched in 2009, attempted to cultivate a new path for Labour centrism that would appeal to socially conservative working-class voters. The party later moved decisively to the left when the socialist Jeremy Corbyn became the leader in 2015 due to the introduction of a one member one vote system under Miliband.

In 2011, Nick Clegg, then leader of the Liberal Democrats and Deputy Prime Minister of the United Kingdom, stated that he believed that his party belonged to the radical centre, mentioning John Maynard Keynes, William Beveridge, Jo Grimond, David Lloyd George and John Stuart Mill as examples that preceded the Liberal Democrats' establishment in 1988. He pointed to liberalism as an ideology of people and described the political spectrum and his party's position as follows: "For the left, an obsession with the state. For the right, a worship of the market. But as liberals, we place our faith in people. People with power and opportunity in their hands. Our opponents try to divide us with their outdated labels of left and right. But we are not on the left and we are not on the right. We have our own label: Liberal. We are liberals and we own the freehold to the centre ground of British politics. Our politics is the politics of the radical centre."

In the mid to late 2000s, David Cameron also moved the Conservative Party towards the centre and, after the 2010 general election, formed a coalition with the Liberal Democrats. In the 2015 United Kingdom general election, the Conservatives gained a majority, and the Liberal Democrats lost most of their seats. They regained a small number of seats in the 2017 United Kingdom general election. On her appointment as Prime Minister, Cameron's successor, Theresa May, stated her wish to tackle social inequality and adopted some of Ed Miliband's policies, such as regulating energy companies. However, the party's 2017 manifesto was seen as a sharp break from the centre ground, appealing to traditionally Tory heartland issues in the aftermath of the UK's Brexit referendum.

Following the Brexit referendum, politics in the UK was seen as having reverted to traditionally polarised "left and right" politics. For the 2017 election, the group More United was set up in the vein of the US Super PAC model to support candidates from multiple parties who meet its values; it supported primarily Labour and Lib Dem MP and one Conservative. In 2018, a group set up by Simon Franks amassed £50 million to start a new centrist political party in the UK to field candidates at the next general election. It was reportedly named United for Change.

In early 2019, difficulties and party clashes regarding Brexit caused many Labour and Conservative MPs to leave their parties, forming a pro-European group named The Independent Group for Change. They later announced their intention to register as a formal party named Change UK. Most sources identified the party as centrist, with Change UK MP Chris Leslie describing the party as "offering a home to those on the centre-left". Former Change UK MP Chuka Umunna joined the Liberal Democrats shortly after the party's formation after disappointing results in the 2019 European Parliament election in the United Kingdom. After losing all its MPs in the 2019 United Kingdom general election, the party was disbanded.

United States 

After World War II, centrism was a dominant political philosophy in the United States but lacked its party in the traditionally two-party country. For example, historian Arthur Schlesinger Jr. characterized political moderation as a vigorous "Third Force" in his 1949 book, The Vital Center. The book defended liberal democracy and a state-regulated market economy against the totalitarianism of communism and fascism. Harry Truman, who served as U.S. president from 1945 until 1953, is regarded as a centrist Democrat, while Dwight Eisenhower, president from 1953 to 1961, is regarded as a centrist Republican.

The early 1990s were perhaps the high water mark of post-war centrist politics in America. Journalist and political commentator E. J. Dionne wrote in his book Why Americans Hate Politics, published on the eve of the 1992 presidential election, that he believes American voters are looking for a "New Political Center" that intermixes "liberal instincts" and "conservative values". He labelled people in this centre position as "tolerant traditionalists". He described them as believers in conventional social morals that ensure family stability, as tolerant within reason to those who challenge those morals and as pragmatically supportive of government intervention in spheres such as education, child care and health care, as long as budgets are balanced. Independent candidate H. Ross Perot, who focused on pragmatic issues like a balanced budget and was viewed as a populist centrist, garnered nearly 19% of the popular vote in the 1992 presidential election, even though he ran against Bill Clinton, a centre-left Democrat, and George H. W. Bush, a centre-right Republican. Perot went on to form the Reform Party and run a second time in the 1996 presidential election, but with less success.

A late-2011 Gallup poll of Americans' attitudes towards government reported that 17% expressed conservative views, 22% expressed libertarian views, 20% expressed communitarian views, 17% expressed centrist views, and 24% expressed liberal views.

Americans Elect, a coalition of American centrists funded by wealthy donors such as business magnate Michael Bloomberg, former junk-bond trader Peter Ackerman and hedge fund manager John H. Burbank III, launched an effort in mid-2011 to create a national "virtual primary" that would challenge the current two-party system. The group aimed to nominate a presidential ticket of centrists with names that would be on ballots in all 50 states. The group banked on broad cultural dissatisfaction with the partisan gridlock in Washington, D.C. The Christian Science Monitor has stated that "the political climate couldn't be riper for a serious third-party alternative" such as their effort, but the "hurdles Americans Elect faces are daunting" to get on ballots.

Washington political journalist Linda Killian wrote in her 2012 book The Swing Vote that Americans are frustrated with Congress and its dysfunction and inability to do its job. Many Americans are unsatisfied with the political process because of many factors, such as the influx of money into politics and the influence of special interests and lobbyists. The book classifies four types of independent voters, including "NPR Republicans", "America First Democrats", "The Facebook Generation", and "Starbucks Moms and Dads", who were big determinates of swing votes in the 2012 presidential election. Journalist and author John Avlon wrote in his 2005 book Independent Nation that centrism is not a matter of compromise or reading polls; rather, it is an antidote to the politics of divisiveness, providing principled opposition to political extremes.

Centrists in the two major U.S. political parties are often found in the New Democrat Coalition, the Blue Dog Coalition of the Democratic Party, the Republican Main Street Partnership of the Republican Party, and the bipartisan Problem Solvers Caucus. Barack Obama has been widely identified as a centrist Democrat president, as has Joe Biden. Outside the two major parties, some centrists inhabit the Libertarian Party, independent candidacy movements, such as Unite America, co-founded by Charles Wheelan, and the Forward Party, established by Andrew Yang in 2021.

See also

Notes

References

Further reading 
 Ali, Tariq (2015). The Extreme Centre: A Warning. Verso Books.
 Brown, David S. (2016). Moderates: The Vital Center of American Politics, from the Founding to Today. Chapel Hill: University of North Carolina Press.

External links 
 
 

 
Liberalism
Communitarianism
Political ideologies
Political spectrum
Political theories